The Yuva Puraskar (Hindi: युवा पुरस्कार), also known as Sahitya Akademi Yuva Puraskar, is a literary honor in India which Sahitya Akademi, India's National Academy of Letters, annually confers on young writers of outstanding works in one of the 24 major Indian languages. Instituted in 2011, it recognises young writers under the age of 35, with the aim of encouraging and promoting young writers. It comprises a cash prize of Rs. 50,000 and an engraved copper plaque.

Lists of recipients by languages 

 List of Yuva Puraskar winners for Assamese
 List of Yuva Puraskar winners for Bengali
 List of Yuva Puraskar winners for Bodo
 List of Yuva Puraskar winners for Dogri
 List of Yuva Puraskar winners for English
 List of Yuva Puraskar winners for Gujarati
 List of Yuva Puraskar winners for Hindi
 List of Yuva Puraskar winners for Kannada
 List of Yuva Puraskar winners for Kashmiri
 List of Yuva Puraskar winners for Konkani
 List of Yuva Puraskar winners for Maithili
 List of Yuva Puraskar winners for Malayalam
 List of Yuva Puraskar winners for Manipuri
 List of Yuva Puraskar winners for Marathi
 List of Yuva Puraskar winners for Nepali
 List of Yuva Puraskar winners for Odia
 List of Yuva Puraskar winners for Punjabi
 List of Yuva Puraskar winners for Rajasthani
 List of Yuva Puraskar winners for Sanskrit
 List of Yuva Puraskar winners for Santali
 List of Yuva Puraskar winners for Sindhi
 List of Yuva Puraskar Winners for Tamil
 List of Yuva Puraskar winners for Telugu
 List of Yuva Puraskar winners for Urdu

References

Sahitya Akademi
Indian literary awards
2011 establishments in Delhi